John Tribe (born 10 June 1938) is an English illustrator and graphic designer best known for his work for the British television broadcaster London Weekend Television, which presently forms part of the ITV network. In 1985, he won the Primetime Emmy Award for Outstanding Graphic and Title Design for his work on the ten part television series: Agatha Christie's Partners in Crime (1983).

London Weekend Television
Tribe was a member of the Art Department at the Greater London network and his work involved creating title sequences and artwork for the following programmes:

References

English graphic designers
Living people
Emmy Award winners
Place of birth missing (living people)
1938 births